The 2000 Big South Conference baseball tournament  was the postseason baseball tournament for the Big South Conference, held from May 17 through 20 at Charles Watson Stadium, home field of regular season champion Coastal Carolina in Conway, South Carolina.  All eight teams participated in the double-elimination tournament. The champion, won the title for the third time, and second in three seasons, and earned an invitation to the 2000 NCAA Division I baseball tournament.

Format
All teams qualified for the tournament.  The teams were seeded one through eight based on conference winning percentage and played a double-elimination tournament.

Bracket and results

All-Tournament Team

Most Valuable Player
Jason Suitt was named Tournament Most Valuable Player.  Suitt was a pitcher for Liberty.

References

Tournament
Big South Conference Baseball Tournament
Big South baseball tournament
Big South Conference baseball tournament